The Freedom Congregational Church is a registered historical building in Freedom Township, Portage County, Ohio.  It was listed on the United States National Register of Historic Places on July 7, 1975.  The church is located at 8961 State Route 88 in the triangular area near the center of Freedom where State Routes 88, 700, and 303 meet.

References

External links

 Official website

Churches on the National Register of Historic Places in Ohio
Churches in Portage County, Ohio
National Register of Historic Places in Portage County, Ohio